Dan Coulter is a Canadian politician who was elected to the Legislative Assembly of British Columbia in the 2020 British Columbia general election. He represents the electoral district of Chilliwack as a member of the British Columbia New Democratic Party caucus. He defeated John Martin; prior to the 2020 election, Chilliwack had been considered a BC Liberal stronghold.

In addition to serving as MLA for Chilliwack, Dan Coulter is Minister of State for Infrastructure and Transit, working within the Ministry of Transportation and Infrastructure in the Eby ministry.

Coulter was previously Parliamentary Secretary for Accessibility  under the Ministry of Social Development and Poverty Reduction in the Horgan ministry, where his mandate included consulting with advocates, communities and businesses to ensure that the new Accessible British Columbia Act would be effective and well understood and working with the Attorney General and Minister responsible for Housing to work on BC Building Code changes to make new buildings more accessible.

Background
Dan Coulter was born in 1975 in Vancouver, British Columbia. He grew up in Edmonton and Abbotsford. After graduating from high school in 1993, he worked as a welder and then became a certified Millwright with the Red Seal Program in 1999. Dan Coulter was severely injured in a workplace accident in 1999 and is a wheelchair user. After his accident, he attended the  University of the Fraser Valley

In 2011, Dan ran for school trustee in Chilliwack. He was unsuccessful, coming in 8th place and falling short of the 7th board seat by 384 votes. Dan ran for school trustee again in the 2013 byelection and was successful. Dan was re-elected in the 2014 general municipal election and received the third highest number of votes.

In October 2017, fellow Chilliwack school trustee Barry Neufeld made a Facebook post in which he called supporting transgender children in their gender identity child abuse, cited the American College of Pediatricians (an anti-LGBTQ organization) and said that he belonged "in a country like Russia, or Paraguay, which recently had the guts to stand up to these radical cultural nihilists.” Dan Coulter immediately took a stand for LGBTQ+ people and said, "I have friends that are Trans and I know students that are too. This hatred is aimed straight at who they are. It tries to make their existence illegitimate. It pisses me off! Our students and staff need to feel safe in our schools and a valued part of the school community – because they are!” In November 2017, Dan Coulter called on Barry Neufeld to resign.

Dan was reelected to the Chilliwack Board of education in 2018 with the highest number of votes. He served as board chair from November 2018 to November 2020. He resigned from the Chilliwack Board of Education on November 25, 2020, after being sworn in as MLA for Chilliwack.

Dan lives in Chilliwack with his wife, Rebecca, and their dogs, Spencer and Anna-Bella.

Electoral record

References 

Living people
People from Chilliwack
21st-century Canadian politicians
British Columbia New Democratic Party MLAs
Year of birth missing (living people)